The 1972 United States Senate election in Iowa took place on November 7, 1972. Incumbent Republican U.S. Senator Jack Miller ran for re-election to a third term but was defeated by Democrat Dick Clark.

Republican primary

Candidates
Jack Miller, incumbent Senator since 1961
Ralph Scott

Results

General election

Results

See also 
 1972 United States Senate elections

References 

1972
Iowa
United States Senate